The Bobby Fischer Center (Icelandic: Fischersetur) is a small non-profit biographical museum housing memorabilia of the 1972 World Chess Champion, Bobby Fischer located in Selfoss, Iceland.

Contents

The Bobby Fischer Center has on display photos, the scoresheets, a printout for the radiation measurements demanded by Boris Spassky´s delegation after the 17th game and a replica of the chessboard used during the World Chess Championship 1972. The museum includes interesting artifacts related to Fischer's stay in Iceland from 2005 to 2008, including Fischer's chair from the antiquarian bookshop Bókin in Reykjavík.

Other activities
The building facilitates the Chess Club of Selfoss and Vicinity to play and learn about chess.  In addition, the building is a venue for chess exhibitions and presentations.

Fischer's grave

Fischer's grave site is at Laugardælir cemetery, about two kilometres (25 minute walk) away from the Bobby Fischer Center.

See also

 Culture of Iceland
 Icelandic Chess Championship
 Reykjavik Open

References

External links
 Bobby Fischer Center - Homepage
 FaceBook - Bobby Fischer Center

Biographical museums in Iceland
Bobby Fischer
Chess clubs
Chess in Iceland
Chess museums
Selfoss
Sports venues in Iceland